The NWA San Francisco United States Championship was a version of the NWA United States Heavyweight Championship that was defended in NWA San Francisco and, later, Big Time Wrestling. The title, which originated as the American Wrestling Alliance United States Championship and was renamed in 1968, existed from 1960 until 1981.

Title history

See also

National Wrestling Alliance

References

Big Time Wrestling (San Francisco) championships
National Wrestling Alliance championships
NWA United States Heavyweight Championships